WCRP (88.1 FM), branded on-air as 88.1 Inspira, is a radio station broadcasting a Spanish Religious format. Licensed to Guayama, Puerto Rico, it serves the greater Puerto Rico area.  The station is currently owned by Diaz-Pabon Ministries, through the licensee, Ministerio Radial Cristo Viene Pronto, Inc.

External links

CRP
Radio stations established in 1982
Guayama, Puerto Rico
1982 establishments in Puerto Rico